The Christy Ring Cup is an annual hurling competition organised by the Gaelic Athletic Association. Originally introduced as a second-tier competition, it is currently the third tier overall in the inter-county hurling championship system. Each year, the champions of the Christy Ring Cup are promoted to the Joe McDonagh Cup, and the lowest finishing team is relegated to the Nicky Rackard Cup. Kildare are the 2022 title-holders.  The competition is named in honour of Christy Ring, a legendary player from Cork.

The Christy Ring Cup, which was introduced in 2005, replaced the All-Ireland B Hurling Championship (1974-2004). Between 2005 and 2017 the Christy Ring Cup was the second tier hurling championship. With the introduction of the Joe McDonagh cup, the Christy Ring Cup is the highest tier of the championship system without entry to that year's All-Ireland finals series (the top two teams in the Joe McDonagh Cup usually gain entry to preliminary quarter-finals of the All-Ireland Senior Hurling Championship).

At present (2021), Wicklow holds the longest tenure in the Christy Ring Cup. They have appeared in every season of the cup. Down and Kildare had appeared in every season until 2021, when they participated in the Joe McDonagh Cup.

History

In 2003 the Hurling Development Committee (HDC) was charged with restructuring the entire hurling championship. The committee was composed of chairman Pat Dunny (Kildare), Liam Griffin (Wexford), P. J. O'Grady (Limerick), Ger Loughnane (Clare), Cyril Farrell (Galway), Jimmy O'Reilly (Down), Willie Ring (Cork), Pat Daly (GAA Games Development Officer) and Nicky English (Tipperary). Over the course of three months they held discussions with managers, players and officials, while also taking a submission from the Gaelic Players Association. The basic tenet of the proposals was to structure the hurling championship into three tiers in accordance with 2004 National Hurling League status. The top tier was confined to 12 teams, while the next ten teams would contest the second tier which was to be known as the Christy Ring Cup. There would also be promotion-relegation play-offs between the three championship tiers. The HDC also suggested that these games would be played as curtain raisers to All-Ireland quarter-finals and semi-finals.

The proposal were accepted at the 2004 GAA Congress. The Christy Ring Cup and the Nicky Rackard Cup competitions were launched at Croke Park on 8 December 2004.

Format

2005-2007

The ten participating teams were divided into two groups of five and played in a round-robin format. Each team was guaranteed at least four games each. The eventual group winners and runners-up qualified for the knock-out semi-finals of the competition.

The bottom two teams of both groups were involved in a four-way relegation play-off with the eventual loser being relegated to the Nicky Rackard Cup. In 2006 the relegation play-off was limited to just the bottom teams in both groups, while in 2007 there was no relegation.

2008

The competition was expanded to include twelve teams. The participating teams were divided into four groups of three and played in a round-robin format, thus limiting each team to just two games each. The eventual group winners and runners-up qualified for the knock-out quarter-finals of the competition.

The bottom team in each group went into the relegation play-offs. The eventual losers were relegated to the Nicky Rackard Cup, however, the relegation play-offs in 2008 were rendered meaningless as all four bottom-placed teams were relegated.

2009-2017

In 2009 a double elimination format was introduced, thus guaranteeing each team at least two games before being eliminated from the competition.

The eight teams play four Round 1 matches.
 The winners in Round 1 advance to Round 2A.
 The losers in Round 1 go into Round 2B.
There are two Round 2A matches.
 The winners in Round 2A advance to the semi-finals.
 The losers in Round 2A go into the quarter-finals.
There are two Round 2B matches.
 The winners in Round 2B advance to the quarter-finals.
 The losers in Round 2B go into the bottom playoff. The losers of this match play a relegation/promotion match with the winners of the Nicky Rackard Cup. If they lose they are relegated to the Nicky Rackard cup for the following year.
There are two quarter-final matches between the Round 2A losers and Round 2B winners.
 The winners of the quarter-finals advance to the semi-finals.
 The losers of the quarter-finals are eliminated.
There are two semi-final matches between the Round 2A winners and the quarter-final winners.
 The winners of the semi-finals advance to the final.
 The losers of the semi-finals are eliminated.
The winners of the final (with the exception of Down in 2013, are promoted to the Liam MacCarthy Cup for the following year.

From 2018

2018 saw the reintroduction of a group phase format to all tiers of the hurling Championship structure. The eight participating teams are divided into two groups of four and will play in a round-robin format. Each team will be guaranteed at least three games each. The eventual group winners and runners-up will qualify for the knock-out semi-finals of the championship.

2020 and the coronavirus pandemic

The Coronavirus pandemic in 2020 significantly affected the GAA season, with the Chisty Ring Cup reverting for one season only to the partial double elimination format that existed until 2017.

List of finals and relegated teams

Team records and statistics

Performance by county

Performance by province

Year by year

Player records

Top scorers overall

Top Scorers in the Final

See also
 Christy Ring Cup records and statistics

References

 
2005 establishments in Ireland
All-Ireland inter-county hurling championships
Hurling cup competitions
Recurring sporting events established in 2005